Gold Peak is an Asian manufacturer and brand of batteries and chargers.

Gold Peak can also refer to:

 Gold Peak Tea, a brand of the Coca-Cola company
 Peak gold, a speculation in economics